William Pickersgill (1861 – 2 May 1928) was an English railway engineer, and was chief mechanical engineer of the Caledonian Railway from 1914  until Grouping in 1923.  He was appointed locomotive superintendent of the Northern Division of the London, Midland and Scottish Railway but retired in 1925.  He died in Bournemouth.

Career

Great Eastern Railway
Pickersgill was born in Nantwich, Cheshire. He started work on the Great Eastern Railway at Stratford in 1876, where he was a Whitworth Exhibitioner, and after several posts in the running department he was appointed district locomotive superintendent in Norwich in 1891.

Great North of Scotland Railway
In 1894, he succeeded James Johnson as the locomotive superintendent of the Great North of Scotland Railway, where he continued to develop the 4-4-0 type for that railway and was responsible for the new locomotive works at Inverurie which replaced the unsatisfactory premises at Kittybrewster.  He was chairman of the Association of Railway Locomotive Engineers in 1912 and was interested in flange and check rail dimensions.

Caledonian Railway
In March 1914 succeeded John F. McIntosh as locomotive, carriage & wagon superintendent of the Caledonian Railway. He further developed the McIntosh 4-4-0 type, introduced the class 60 4-6-0 for freight service, and an extraordinary 4-6-0 with derived motion which was highly unsuccessful.

London Midland and Scottish Railway
Following the Grouping, he was appointed mechanical engineer of the Northern Division of the London, Midland and Scottish Railway but retired in 1925.

Locomotive designs
William Pickersgill's locomotive designs for the Great North of Scotland Railway included:
 GNoSR class T 4-4-0: 26 built 1895–98 – became part of LNER class D41
 GNoSR class V 4-4-0: 18 built 1899–1915 – 5 sold new to South Eastern and Chatham Railway, becoming SECR G class; remainder became part of LNER class D40
 GNoSR class W 0-2-2 Railmotor: 2 built 1905

William Pickersgill's locomotive designs for the Caledonian Railway included:
Caledonian Railway 191 Class 4-6-0  (3P)
Caledonian Railway 60 Class 4-6-0   (4P)
Caledonian Railway 956 Class 4-6-0 (5P)
Caledonian Railway 113 class 4-4-0 Dunalastair V  (3P)
Caledonian Railway 72 Class 4-4-0 Dunalastair V  (3P)
Caledonian Railway 300 Class 0-6-0  (3F)
Caledonian Railway 159 Class 0-4-4T (2P)
Caledonian Railway 431 Class 0-4-4T (2P)
Caledonian Railway 944 Class 4-6-2T (4P)

See also
 Locomotives of the London, Midland and Scottish Railway

References

External links
 William Pickersgill at www.steamindex.com

Locomotive builders and designers
1861 births
1928 deaths
English railway mechanical engineers
People from Crewe
People from Nantwich
Caledonian Railway people